Payal may refer to:

Payal, India, a town in India
Payal Assembly Constituency, the Punjab assembly constituency encompassing the town
Payal, Nepal, a town in Nepal
 Payal, an Indian anklet
 Payal Rohatgi, an Indian actress
 Payal (film), a 1957 Hindi-language film

See also
 Paayal, a 1992 Bollywood film